The Rev Norman Miller Johnson FRSE FSA Scot FEIS (1887-1949) was a Scottish minister and academic author.

Life
He studied at Manchester University where he gained a BSc. Concentrating on education he spent most of his life as Headmaster of Dunfermline Public School.

In 1939 he was elected a Fellow of the Royal Society of Edinburgh. His proposers were James Wright, Henry Smith Holden, Alexander Condie Stephen, James Ernest Richey and James Livingstone Begg.

He retrained in later life as a minister.

He died at the manse at Eday on Orkney on 1 December 1949.

Publications

A Brief Guide to Dunfermline Abbey (1933)

References

1887 births
1949 deaths
Fellows of the Royal Society of Edinburgh
Alumni of the University of Manchester
Scottish non-fiction writers
People associated with Orkney
20th-century Ministers of the Church of Scotland
Scottish educators
Scottish antiquarians
Place of birth missing
Fellows of the Society of Antiquaries of Scotland
20th-century antiquarians